Dawn Seymour (July 1, 1917 - July 18, 2017) was a Women Airforce Service Pilot during World War II. She would later lobby for military status for the Women Airforce Service Pilots as well as encourage recognition of their contributions to the war effort during World War II.

Early life 
She was born in Rochester, New York on July 1, 1917.

She was the first woman accepted into the Civilian Pilot Training Program at Cornell University.  In 1939, she earned a bachelor's degree at Cornell University.

During World War II 
During WWII, she was a Women's Airforce Service Pilot, or WASP at Buckingham Air Force Base in Florida.

Later life 
She actively campaigned for military status for the Women Airforce Service Pilots.

Honors 
Her 100th birthday party was celebrated at the opening reception of Women in Aviation International’s 2017 annual conference.

Publications 
Seymour, Dawn, Clarice I. Bergemann, Jeanette J. Jenkins, and Mary Ellen Keil. Women Airforce Service Pilots, WWII: In Memoriam : Thirty-Eight American Women Pilots Gave Their Lives in Performance of Duty with the United States Army Air Forces 1942-1943-1944. Denton, Tex: Texas Woman's University Press, 1996.

Death and legacy 
She died aged 100 on July 18, 2017.

References

External links
 The Boundless Sky by Dawn Seymour. A 97 year old woman describes training young men for WWII combat as a WASP, with Moth Radio Extra: Full interview including photos. Veterans Day Special 2014.  The Moth Radio Hour.

1917 births
2017 deaths
Women aviators
Cornell University alumni
Women air force personnel
American centenarians
American activists
Women centenarians
People from Rochester, New York